Velilla de Ebro is a municipality located in the Zaragoza Province, Aragon, Spain. According to the 2009 census (INE), the municipality has a population of 261 inhabitants.

This town is located close to the Purburell or Pui Burell mountain.

See also
Ribera Baja del Ebro

References

External links 

Velilla de Ebro Town Hall - Official Site

Municipalities in the Province of Zaragoza